Robert E. Lamb (born November 17, 1936) was United States Assistant Secretary of State for Administration from 1983 to 1985; Assistant Secretary of State for Diplomatic Security from 1987 to 1989; and United States Ambassador to Cyprus from 1990 to 1993.

Biography

Robert E. Lamb was born in Atlanta, Georgia, on November 17, 1936.  He was educated at the University of Pennsylvania, receiving an A.B. in 1962.

After college, Lamb joined the United States Foreign Service beginning a career as a Foreign Service Officer.  A career diplomat, he rose through the ranks of the United States Department of State to become Director of the United States Passport Office in the Bureau of Consular Affairs and Director of Financial Services.

In 1983, President of the United States Ronald Reagan nominated Lamb as Assistant Secretary of State for Administration, and Lamb held this office from December 19, 1983, until July 1, 1985.  He then became Director of the Bureau of Diplomatic Security.  In 1987, the head of the Bureau of Diplomatic Security was elevated to the rank of Assistant Secretary and President Reagan named Lamb as the first Assistant Secretary of State for Diplomatic Security.  Lamb held this office from June 19, 1987, until August 9, 1989.

President George H. W. Bush then nominated Lamb as United States Ambassador to Cyprus, with Lamb presenting his credentials on November 30, 1990, and serving as Ambassador to Cyprus until October 24, 1993.

Lamb retired from the Foreign Service in 1994. He then became Executive Director of the American Philatelic Society in State College, Pennsylvania. He retired from that position in 2006. Under his administration, the Society moved its headquarters to an historic, former Match Factory in Bellefonte, Pennsylvania. Upon his retirement, the Society named the Executive wing of the headquarters complex in his honor.

References
 President Reagan's Nomination of Lamb as Assistant Secretary of State for Diplomatic Security
 President Bush's Nomination of Lamb as Ambassador to Cyprus

1936 births
Living people
United States Assistant Secretaries of State
Ambassadors of the United States to Cyprus
University of Pennsylvania alumni
People from Fairfax County, Virginia
People from Atlanta
United States Foreign Service personnel